Thalappalam  is a village in Kottayam district in the state of Kerala, India.

Demographics
 India census, Thalappalam had a population of 12150 with 6228 males and 5922 females.

References

Villages in Kottayam district